S2242 is an experimental antiviral agent that is an inhibitor of herpes virus replication.

References

Antiviral drugs
Purines